Sara Lawrence-Lightfoot (born August 22, 1944) is an American sociologist who examines the culture of schools, the patterns and structures of classroom life, socialization within families and communities, and the relationships between culture and learning styles. She is the Emily Hargroves Fisher professor at the Harvard Graduate School of Education and a 1984 MacArthur Genius.

Career
Lawrence-Lightfoot has pioneered portraiture, an approach to social science methodology that bridges the realms of aesthetics and empiricism, which she continues to use in her own work.

She has written 10 books, including I've Known Rivers, which explores the development of creativity and wisdom using the lens of "human archaeology," The Art and Science of Portraiture, which documents her pioneering approach to social science methodology, and The Third Chapter: Passion, Risk, and Adventure in the 25 Years After 50 (2009). Her most recent book, Exit: The Endings That Set Us Free, was a non-fiction nominee for the 2013 Hurston/Wright Legacy Award.

Honors
In 1984, Lawrence-Lightfoot was awarded a MacArthur Fellowship, and thereafter became the first MacArthur grant recipient to serve as a member, and as chair, of the foundation’s board. In 1993, received Harvard's George Ledlie Prize for research that makes the "most valuable contribution to science" and "the benefit of mankind." She received a Candace Award from the National Coalition of 100 Black Women in 1990.

In March 1998, she was the recipient of the Emily Hargroves Fisher endowed chair at Harvard University, which, upon her retirement, will become the Sara Lawrence-Lightfoot endowed chair, making her the first African-American woman in Harvard's history to have an endowed professorship named in her honor. She also has an endowed professorship named in her honor at Swarthmore College. In 2003, the Academy of Political and Social Sciences named her as its Margaret Mead Fellow.

Lawrence-Lightfoot was featured on the 2006 PBS television documentary African American Lives. In 2008, she was elected to membership in the American Philosophical Society.

Works

Books 
Worlds Apart: Relationships Between Families and Schools (1978)
Beyond Bias: Perspectives on Classrooms (1978)
The Good High School: Portraits of Character and Courage (1983)
Balm in Gilead: Journey of a Healer (1988), a personal memoir and biography of her mother, Margaret Morgan Lawrence
Respect: An Exploration (1990)
I've Known Rivers: Lives of Loss and Liberation (1995)
The Art and Science of Portraiture (1997)
The Essential Conversation: What Parents and Teachers Can Learn from Each Other (2003)
The Third Chapter: Passion, Risk, and Adventure in the 25 Years After 50 (2009). 
Exit: The Endings That Set Us Free (2012). 
Growing Each Other Up: When Our Children Become Our Teachers (2016).

Selected articles 

 1973. Politics and reasoning: Through the eyes of teachers and children. Harvard Educational Review, 43(2), 197-244.
 1977. Family-school interactions: The cultural image of mothers and teachers. Signs: Journal of Women in Culture and Society, 3(2), 395-408.
 1981. Toward conflict and resolution: Relationships between families and schools. Theory into Practice, 20(2), 97-104.
 1986. On goodness in schools: Themes of empowerment. Peabody Journal of Education, 63(3), 9-28.
 2005. Reflections on portraiture: A dialogue between art and science. Qualitative Inquiry, 11(1), 3-15.
 2016. Commentary: Portraiture methodology: Blending art and science. LEARNing Landscapes, 9(2), 19-27.

Personal life 
Lawrence-Lightfoot comes from a family of educators. Both of her paternal grandparents were teachers in Mississippi. One of her maternal grandparents was a teacher as well, while the other was a priest. Lawrence-Lightfoot's mother, Dr. Margaret Morgan Lawrence, was the only African-American undergraduate student at Cornell, where she received a full scholarship to attend. Lawrence-Lightfoot's father, Charles Lawrence II, was a professor in the Department of Sociology at Brooklyn College. and a civil rights activist.  Lawrence-Lightfoot is the middle child of three siblings. Her brother, Charles Lawrence III, is a law professor at the University of Hawai'i at Mānoa. Her sister is an Episcopal priest. Lawrence-Lightfoot has two children, a daughter and a son.

References

Sources
 
Harvard Profile

1944 births
Living people
African-American social scientists
American social sciences writers
American sociologists
American women sociologists
Women academics
Swarthmore College alumni
Harvard Graduate School of Education faculty
MacArthur Fellows
Place of birth missing (living people)
Members of the American Philosophical Society
Harvard Graduate School of Education alumni
21st-century African-American people
21st-century African-American women
20th-century African-American people
20th-century African-American women